is a train station in Akiha-ku, Niigata, Niigata Prefecture, Japan.

Lines

Layout

The station consists of two ground-level opposed side platforms serving two tracks, with the station situated above the tracks. The station has a "Midori no Madoguchi" staffed ticket office.

Platforms

History
The station opened on 20 November 1926. The current station building was completed in December 1986. With the privatization of Japanese National Railways (JNR) on 1 April 1987, the station came under the control of JR East.

Surrounding area
Ogikawa Post Office
Ogikawa Elementary School

Passenger statistics
In fiscal 2017, the station was used by an average of 1912 passengers daily (boarding passengers only).

See also
 List of railway stations in Japan

References

External links

 JR East station information 

Shin'etsu Main Line
Railway stations in Japan opened in 1926
Railway stations in Niigata (city)